Pernambut is a state assembly constituency in Tamil Nadu. It is a Scheduled Caste reserved constituency. Elections and winners in the constituency are listed below.

Members of Legislative Assembly

Election results

2006

2001

1996

1991

1989

1984

1980

1977

1971

References

External links

 

Former assembly constituencies of Tamil Nadu